Aleksey Govyrin (born 26 May 1983, Kovrov) is a Russian political figure and a deputy of 8th State Duma. 

In 2006 he started working in the "Askona" company, first as a manager and, later, as a Wholesale Sales Director. In the 2010s, he became the General Director of "Askona-Vek". On September 9, 2018, he was elected deputy of the Legislative Assembly of Vladimir Oblast of the 5th convocation. Since September 2021, he has served as a deputy of the 8th State Duma from the Vladimir Oblast and Ivanovo Oblast constituency.

He is one of the members of the State Duma the United States Treasury sanctioned on 24 March 2022 in response to the 2022 Russian invasion of Ukraine.

References

1983 births
Living people
United Russia politicians
21st-century Russian politicians
Eighth convocation members of the State Duma (Russian Federation)
Russian individuals subject to the U.S. Department of the Treasury sanctions